Gayfer is an English-language surname. People with the name include:

 Harry Gayfer (born 1925), Australian politician
 James Gayfer (1916–1997), Canadian musician
 Michael Gayfer (born 1965), Australian rules footballer

See also
 Gayfers, a department store based in Mobile, Alabama

English-language surnames